Roman Jebavý (born 16 November 1989) is a Czech tennis player. He is a doubles specialist who has won 4 ATP Tour doubles titles. He is the current No. 1 Czech player in doubles. He reached a career-high ranking in doubles of World No. 43 on 4 March 2019.

Junior career
Jebavý reached the 2007 Wimbledon final unseeded with Martin Kližan, before losing to Matteo Trevisan and Daniel López in the final. His career high ranking was number 3. He entered the 2007 U.S. Open seeded first in doubles with Vladimir Ignatic. The tandem lost in the semifinals to champions Jonathan Eysseric and Jerome Interzillo. Jebavý also lost in the singles tournament in the quarterfinals to eventual champion Ričardas Berankis.

Professional career

2008
Jebavy reached his first final on the Futures circuit in Thailand F2 in February 2008. He won his first Futures title a couple of months later in Teplice, Czech Republic. He also won five Futures titles in doubles.

Junior Grand Slam finals

Doubles: 1 (1 runner-up)

ATP career finals

Doubles: 8 (4 titles, 4 runner-ups)

ATP Challenger and ITF Futures finals

Singles: 14 (5–9)

Doubles: 105 (59–46)

Doubles performance timeline

References

External links
 
 

1989 births
Living people
People from Turnov
Czech male tennis players
Sportspeople from the Liberec Region